Ngaski is a Local Government Area in Kebbi State, Nigeria, on the shores of Kainji Lake. Its headquarters are in the town of Wara.

It has an area of 2,633 km and a population of 124,766 at the 2006 census.

The postal code of the area is 870.

References

Local Government Areas in Kebbi State